Telamoptilia geyeri is a moth of the family Gracillariidae. It is known from Zimbabwe and South Africa.

The larvae feed on Pavonia columella. They mine the leaves of their host plant. The mine has the form of a large, very irregular, transparent blotch-mine.

References

Acrocercopinae
Lepidoptera of South Africa
Lepidoptera of Zimbabwe
Moths of Sub-Saharan Africa
Moths described in 1961